The 2020 Calabrian regional election took place in Calabria, Italy, on 26 January 2020. The result was the victory of the centre-right coalition and the election of Jole Santelli as President of Calabria.

The election was held concurrently with a regional election in Emilia-Romagna.

Electoral system

Even if a district list is linked to a regional list that exceeds 8% of the vote, the district list must obtain at least 4% of the vote in the whole region in order to elect their own representatives. To ensure governance, the candidate who receives the most votes wins a majority bonus of 55% of the seats.

Parties and candidates

Opinion polls

Candidates

Parties

Results

Voter turnout

See also
2020 Italian regional elections

References

Elections in Calabria
2020 elections in Italy
January 2020 events in Italy